Lars-Åke Schneider (born 10 July 1955) is a Swedish chess International Master (IM) (1976), four time Swedish Chess Championship winner (1979, 1982, 1983, 1986).

Biography
From the mid 1970s to the mid 1990s, Lars-Åke Schneider belonged among the top Swedish chess players.
He four times won Swedish Chess Championship: 1979, 1982, 1983 and 1986. Also Lars-Åke Schneider twice won silver medals in the national championship (1990, 1991) and bronze medals once (1989).

Lars-Åke Schneider successes on the International Chess tournaments include, among others:
 1st place (1982) and four times shared 1st place (1978, 1981, 1985, 1987) in Rilton Cup tournament in Stockholm,
 1st place (1980) and twice shared 1st place (1979, together with Axel Ornstein and 1982, together with Lars Karlsson) in Eksjö,
 shared 2nd place in Esbjerg (1977, tournament The North Sea Cup, after Jens Kristiansen, together with William Hartston),
 shared 1st place in Netanya (1977, together with Khosro Harandi),
 shared 1st place in Roskilde (1978, together with Heikki Westerinen),
 1st place in Gladsaxe (1979),
 1st place in Oslo (1980),
 2nd place in Hamburg (1981),
 3rd place in Esbjerg (1983, Nordic Chess Championship, after Curt Hansen and Tom Wedberg).

Lars-Åke Schneider played for Sweden in the Chess Olympiads:
 In 1976, at second reserve board in the 22nd Chess Olympiad in Haifa (+4, =1, -2),
 In 1978, at third board in the 23rd Chess Olympiad in Buenos Aires (+3, =5, -3),
 In 1980, at third board in the 24th Chess Olympiad in La Valletta (+3, =3, -3),
 In 1982, at fourth board in the 25th Chess Olympiad in Lucerne (+3, =2, -3),
 In 1984, at second reserve board in the 26th Chess Olympiad in Thessaloniki (+1, =3, -2).

Lars-Åke Schneider played for Sweden in the European Team Chess Championship:
 In 1980, at third board in the 7th European Team Chess Championship in Skara (+1, =4, -2).

Lars-Åke Schneider played for Sweden in the Nordic Chess Cup:
 In 1975, at third board in the 6th Nordic Chess Cup in Hindås (+1, =1, -3),
 In 1976, at fourth board in the 7th Nordic Chess Cup in Bremen (+1, =1, -3),
 In 1983, at second board in the 9th Nordic Chess Cup in Oslo (+2, =4, -1) and won team bronze medal.

In 1976, he was awarded the FIDE International Master (IM) title.

References

External links

Lars-Åke Schneider chess games at 365chess.com

1955 births
Living people
Sportspeople from Stockholm
Swedish chess players
Chess International Masters
Chess Olympiad competitors